The Mississippi Canyon Pipeline is a natural gas pipeline which brings gas from the Mississippi Canyon region of the offshore Gulf of Mexico into Louisiana.  It was commissioned in October 1996. The pipeline is owned by Enbridge.

Technical description

External links
Pipeline Electronic Bulletin Board
Mississippi Canyon Gas Pipeline, L.L.C. 

Natural gas pipelines in the United States
Enbridge pipelines
Natural gas pipelines in Louisiana